Liam Williams may refer to:
Liam Williams (comedian) (born 1988), English comedian
Liam Williams (rugby union) (born 1991), Welsh rugby union player
Liam Williams (boxer) (born 1992), Welsh boxer
Liam Williams (rowing) (born 1960), Irish Olympic rower